A  no frills service or product is one for which the non-essential features have been removed to keep the price low.

No Frills may also refer to:
 No Frills (grocery store), a Canadian supermarket
 No Frills (TV series), a British television sitcom
 No Frills (Bette Midler album) (1983), the sixth studio album by American singer Bette Midler
 No Frills (Nik Kershaw album) (2010), the eighth album by Nik Kershaw
 No Frills Supermarkets, a grocery chain in Nebraska and Iowa
 No Frills, a home brand of products sold at Franklins
 No Frills, a home brand of products formerly sold at Kwik Save
 No Frills, a home brand of products formerly sold at Pathmark
 No Frills, a home brand of products sold at Wellcome

See also
 Frill (disambiguation)